The 1991–92 Scottish Second Division was won by Dumbarton who, along with second placed Cowdenbeath, were promoted to the First Division. Albion Rovers finished bottom.

Table

References 

Scottish Second Division seasons
Scot
3